The Faculty of Political Science and International Relations at Matej Bel University (commonly referred as FPVMV), (Slovak: Fakulta politických vied a medzinárodných vzťahov Univerzity Mateja Bela v Banskej Bystrici) is the international relations school of Matej Bel University. FPVMV offers bachelor's degrees in International Relations and Political Science and, master's degrees in International relations, Security studies, and Political science and also grants doctoral degrees in International Relations, and Political Science. It conducts research in subjects relating to international affairs, security and government. The faculty is recognized as one of the leading international relations teaching and research institutes in Central Europe.
 
FPVMV is noted for having an active student body, various organisations founded by students during their studies at FPVMV went on to become major national and international non-governmental organisations active in the field of international relations and security studies. Since 2009 the faculty headquarters the National Center of Excellence for International Security Studies funded through the RD Program of the EU.

FPVMV's alumni and faculty have included multiple ambassadors, diplomats, politicians, and public figures.

Campus

The faculty campus is located in the historical city downtown of Banská Bystrica, bordering the branch office of the National Bank of Slovakia and the Matej Bel University Rector's department. The campus consists of two buildings, which are set in a 4-acre urban park overlooking the river Hron. The main building is a late 19th-century finishing school, which was completely reconstructed in 1995 and 2010. The second building is a late 19th-century headmaster's house, which for many years has been serving as a headquarters for multiple student-run organizations.

Academics

The faculty has had a distinctive international reputation since it was founded in 1995. The faculty's graduates have, on average, one of the largest salaries in the country.

Academic departments

The faculty consists of the following departments:

 Department of International Relations and Diplomacy

The Department of International Relations and Diplomacy deals with teaching activities related to the following subjects: Diplomacy, Diplomatic and Consular Law, European Studies, Geopolitics of the Slovak Republic, Humanitarian Law, Integration Processes and Basic Principles of European Law, Canadian Studies, etc. The department also offers a doctoral degree program in international relations and diplomacy.

 Department of Politics

The Department of Politics provides full-time bachelor's and master's programs in "International Relations" and "Political Science" as well as a full-time doctoral program in "Theory of politics".

 Department of Security Studies

The Department of Security Studies was founded in 2007 and focuses on various issues of international and national security. The department hosts the Center of Excellence for International Security Studies and the UMB Data and Society Lab. Since 2017 the department runs a master's program in "Security Studies" and

Center of excellence
FPVMV headquarters the National Center of Excellence for International Security Studies. The center is funded by the Operational Program for Science and Research of the European Regional Development Fund. Its main goals are to
 Produce cutting-edge academic research by encouraging integrated, multidisciplinary approaches to traditional and emerging challenges to security
 Develop the next generation of academics and practitioners by providing high quality postgraduate education in international security
 Broaden and deepen public understanding of the nexus between interstate conflict, transnational forces and human insecurity
 Produces original and impartial research of (key) modern security issues, and makes this analysis available to policymakers, scholars, journalists, and the public.
The Center of Excellence also houses the UMB Data & Society Lab (UMB DSL), founded in 2018 with financial support from IBM. UMB DSL is the first institute in Slovakia to focus on education, research and policy in the realm of internet and society. The lab is a member institution of the Global Network of Internet and Society Research Centers.

Academic Publishing
The faculty publishes the Politické vedy journal which was run from 1998 to 2000 in cooperation with the Institute of Political Sciences at the Slovak Academy of Sciences, but since 2000 it has been exclusively administrated by the Faculty of Political Science and International Relations.

Partnerships
As a part of its internationally focused education, it encourages students to add an international component to their studies by living in a foreign country. The school believes that the experience is a key part of an education in international affairs because it increases understanding of the world by providing students with a variety of new and unexpected perspectives. The program functions as bilateral partnerships with a number of schools.

Some of these include University of Bologna in Italy, University of Cologne in Germany, Katholieke Universiteit Leuven in Belgium, Ministry of Foreign Affairs (Serbia) - Diplomatic Academy, Complutense University of Madrid in Spain etc. The faculty constantly looks for new partners and schools are added on a yearly basis.

In 2011, the faculty established the Slovak-French University Institute, in partnership with the French Embassy in Slovakia and two French Universities. The institute is headquartered on the school's campus and its main goal is to support scientific cooperation and academic mobility between French and Slovakian universities.

Student life

Student body

There are about 600 full-time students and 40 part-time students at FPVMV. The Faculty is noted for having a very high number of student run organisations. Various organisations founded by students during their studies at FPVMV went on to become major national and international non-governmental organisations active in the field of international relations and security studies. A notable example is Globsec, the organiser of the annual GLOBSEC Forum, and now one of the 50 most influential think-tanks in the world, ranked by the Global Go To Think Tank Index Report at the University of Pennsylvania.
 
Notable student run organisations currently active at FPVMV are e.g. the Euro-Atlantic Center; Central European Security Alliance;  Center of Nations Slovakia, Globsec Academy Center.

Greek life
The Faculty of Political Science and International Relations of Matej Bel University is home to the Sigma Phi Kappa fraternity. However, there is no "Greek row" on campus, nor is the fraternity formally acknowledged by the faculty. Activities of SPK are wide-ranging and include the organization of sporting events, organizing student parties, participating in fund raising events and more. The Sigma Phi Kappa also publishes a newsletter called PARTA HREJ.
SPK's symbol is a platypus, representative colors are yellow and light blue.

Administration
The school is administrated by the Dean's department. The school's scientific and research tasks are however determined by the Scientific Board. The main governing body of the school is the Academic Senate.
The faculty's current dean is Associate Professor Branislav Kováčik. The first dean of the faculty was Peter Kulašik, formerly a senior scientist at the Political Science Institute of the Slovak Academy of Sciences.

Notable alumni

 Jaroslav Naď, Minister of Defence of the Slovak Republic
 Martin Klus, State Secretary of the Ministry of Foreign and European Affairs of the Slovak Republic
 Danka Barteková, Olympic Medalist and member of the International Olympic Committee
 Róbert Vass, President of Globsec
 Roman Hlobeň, Slovak Ambassador in Montenegro
 Tomáš Ferko, Slovak Ambassador in Australia
 Ladislav Babčan, Slovak Ambassador in Lithuania 
 Róbert Ondrejcsák, Slovak Ambassador in the United Kingdom, previously State Secretary of the Ministry of Defence of the Slovak Republic 
 Peter Michaldko, Slovak Ambassador in Greece
 Peter Bátor, Permanent Representative of Slovakia to NATO.
 Natália Šubrtová, Nine time Paralympic Champion
 Ľuboš Blaha, Member of the National Council (Slovakia)
 Ivan Štefunko, Founder and first chairman of the Progressive Slovakia
 Juraj Krúpa, Member of the National Council (Slovakia)
 Monika Beňová, Member of the European Parliament
 Peter Tkačenko, journalist of SME (newspaper)
 Rastislav Kačmár, journalist of Denník N

References

External links
 
 Slovak-French university Institute homepage
 

Schools of international relations
Educational institutions established in 1995
Public policy schools
1995 establishments in Slovakia
Buildings and structures in Banská Bystrica
Political science in Slovakia
Political science education